Paul Schumacher (born April 4, 1951) is an American politician and a member of the unicameral Nebraska Legislature. He resides in Columbus, Nebraska. 

Early life
Schumacher graduated from many educational institutions, Humphrey St. Francis in 1969; Platte College in 1971; Fort Hays State College (B.S., summa cum laude) in 1973; and Georgetown University (J.D.) in 1976. He is a member of both the Nebraska and Florida Bar Association.  He is the president of Community Lottery Systems, Inc. and the vice-president of Community Internet Systems, Inc.  Prior to his appointment to the legislature, he was the Attorney for Platte County.

State legislature
Schumacher was elected in 2010 to represent the 22nd Nebraska legislative district.  He was re-elected in 2014 and served the second four-year term allowed.  While in the legislature, he was a member of the Banking, Commerce and Insurance, Revenue, and Legislature's Planning Committees.

References

 

1951 births
Living people
People from Columbus, Nebraska
Republican Party Nebraska state senators
21st-century American politicians